Commentary or commentaries may refer to:

Publications
 Commentary (magazine), a U.S. public affairs journal, founded in 1945 and formerly published by the American Jewish Committee
 Caesar's Commentaries (disambiguation), a number of works by or attributed to Julius Caesar
 Commentaries of Ishodad of Merv, set of ninth-century Syriac treatises on the Bible
 Commentaries on the Laws of England, a 1769 treatise on the common law of England by Sir William Blackstone
 Commentaries on Living, a series of books by Jiddu Krishnamurti originally published in 1956, 1958 and 1960
 Moralia in Job, a sixth-century treatise by Saint Gregory
 Commentary of Zuo, one of the earliest Chinese works of narrative history, covering the period from 722 to 468 BCE
 Commentaries, a work attributed to Taautus

Other uses
 Published opinion piece material, in any of several forms:
 An editorial, written by the editorial staff or board of a newspaper, magazine, or other periodical
 Column (periodical), a regular feature of such a publication in which usually the same single writer offers advice, observation, or other commentary 
 An op-ed, an opinion piece by an author unaffiliated with the publication
 Letters to the editor, written by readers of such a publication
 Posts made in the comments section of an online publication, serving a similar function to paper periodicals' letters to the editor
 Commentary (philology), a line-by-line or even word-by-word explication (and usually translation) of a text
 Audio commentary track for DVDs and Blu-Rays – an additional audio track that plays in real-time with the video material, and comments on that video
 Sports commentary or play-by-play,  a running description of a game or event in real time, usually during a live broadcast
 Color commentary, supplementing play-by-play commentary, often filling in any time when play is not in progress
 Atthakatha, commentaries on the Pāli Canon in Theravāda Buddhism
 Criticism, the practice of judging the merits and faults of something or someone
 Commentary! The Musical, the musical commentary accompanying Dr. Horrible's Sing-Along Blog
 Commentary or narration, the words in a documentary film
 Exegesis, a critical explanation or interpretation of a text, especially a religious text (e.g. a Bible commentary)
 Literary criticism, the study, evaluation, and interpretation of literature
 Close reading in literary criticism, the careful, sustained interpretation of a brief passage of text
 Political criticism or political commentary, criticism that is specific of or relevant to politics
 Public commentary received by governmental and other bodies, e.g. in response to proposals, reports, etc.

See also
 Commentry, a place in central France
 Comment (disambiguation)
 List of biblical commentaries
 Jewish commentaries on the Bible
 Commentaire, a French quarterly
 Reaction video, commentaries in video format